A smoke ring is a visible vortex ring formed by smoke in a clear atmosphere.

Smoke ring(s) may also refer to:

 Smoke ring (cooking), in barbecue, a characteristic of some smoked meats
 The Smoke Ring (novel), by Larry Niven, 1987
 Leif Anderson or "Smoke Rings" (1925–1999), Swedish radio presenter

Music
 The Smoke Ring (band), a 1960s American rock group
 Smoke Rings (album), a compilation of Swing-era recordings, 1944
 "Smoke Rings", a song by Gene Gifford and Ned Washington that was the theme of the Casa Loma Orchestra, 1932
 "Smoke Rings", a song by Hurricane #1, a B-side of the single "Step into My World", 1997
 "Smoke Rings", a song by k.d. lang from Drag, 1997
 "Smoke Rings", a song by Photek from Modus Operandi, 1997